Sengelmannstraße is a metro station on the Hamburg U-Bahn line U1. The station was opened in September 1975 and is located in the Hamburg district of Alsterdorf, Germany. Alsterdorf is part of the borough of Hamburg-Nord.

Service

Trains 
Sengelmannstraße is served by Hamburg U-Bahn line U1; departures are every 5 minutes.

See also 

 List of Hamburg U-Bahn stations

References

External links 

 Line and route network plans at hvv.de 

Hamburg U-Bahn stations in Hamburg
U1 (Hamburg U-Bahn) stations
Buildings and structures in Hamburg-Nord
Railway stations in Germany opened in 1975
1975 establishments in West Germany